Defiance was a 46-gun galleon of the English Tudor navy, launched in 1590.

She was rebuilt as a 40-gun great ship in 1615 by Phineas Pett I at Woolwich. Defiance was sold out of the navy in 1650.

Notes

References
Citations

Bibliography

Lavery, Brian (2003) The Ship of the Line - Volume 1: The development of the battlefleet 1650-1850. Conway Maritime Press. .

Ships of the English navy
16th-century ships